Louis Khehla Maqhubela (born 1939 in Durban and died in London 6 November 2021) was a South African artist.

Biography 

Louis Maqhubela studied at the Polly Street Art Centre in Johannesburg. One of his earliest exhibitions was in 1959 in Johannesburg, within Artists of Fame and Promise. He continues to exhibit, mainly in London, though his works can be found in galleries and collections in England (London), the United States of America, and South Africa. He lives in London with his wife and family.
 His current works can also be viewed from his personal home page.

Works 

His early work depicted township life but developed rapidly to more abstract approaches. His work is characterized by his use of bold colours and clear references to his African heritage. He works in a variety of media from oil to gouache. Works include:

 Zebra (1962) 
 Untitled 
 Composition 
 Pondo Forms (1996) 
 Trellis (1997)
 Inyoka II (2002)

See also 

 Cecil Skotnes

References

External links 

1939 births
Living people
South African artists
Artists from Durban